Giustino may refer to:

Name
The Italian variation of Justin (name)

People
Giovanni Giustino Ciampini (1633 – 1698), an ecclesiastical archaeologist
Giustino de Jacobis (1800 – 1860), an Italian Roman Catholic bishop
Giustino Durano (1923 – 2002), a long lasting movie actor 
Giustino Episcopio (? – ?), an Italian painter of history and sacred subjects
Giustino Fortunato (1777–1862), an Italian magistrate and politician
Giustino Fortunato (1848 – 1932), an Italian historian and politician
Giustino Menescardi (1720 – 1776), an Italian painter and scenic designer
Giustino Russolillo (1891 – 1955), an Italian Roman Catholic priest
Lorenzo Giustino (born 1991), an Italian tennis player

Places
Giustino, Trentino, a town in Italy
San Giustino, a comune (municipality) in Italy
San Giustino (church), a church in Rome

Operas
Giustino (Legrenzi) (1683), an opera by   Giovanni Legrenzi
Giustino (1703), an opera by Domenico Scarlatti
Giustino (Vivaldi) (1724), an opera by  Antonio Vivaldi 
Giustino (Handel) (1737), an opera by George Frideric Handel 

Italian masculine given names